Mark Thrippleton (born 13 July 1967) is an English actor from Leeds.

Thrippleton worked as a roofer and tiler before taking up acting in the 1980s.

In 1984 he appeared in How We Used to Live — a British educational drama tracing the lives and fortunes of fictional Yorkshire families from Ewardian times. He also played a young Joseph Stalin in the film Testimony (1988), which told the story of the Russian composer Dmitri Shostakovich.

Thrippleton is best known for playing the northern builder, Paul Priestly, in the popular BBC soap opera EastEnders. His character joined the show in 1989, but was one of many to be axed in 1990 following the introduction of the new executive-producer, Michael Ferguson.

Thrippleton has since been seen in the successful ITV soap opera, Coronation Street, playing the minor role of Simon Hanson in 1997.

References

External links

English male soap opera actors
Living people
1968 births